Maximilian Levy (born 26 June 1987) is a German former track cyclist.

Levy won a bronze medal in the men's team sprint representing Germany at the 2008 Olympic Games held in Beijing, China.  At the 2012 Summer Olympics, he won another bronze in the men's team sprint, and a silver in the men's keirin.
He was the world champion in keirin 2009 and in the team sprint 2010, 2011, and 2013. Levy retired from competition after the conclusion of the 2021 UCI Track Champions League in December of that year.

Major results

2004
1st  World Junior Track Cycling championships (Kilo)
1st  World Junior Track Cycling championships (Team sprint) with Robert Förstemann & Benjamin Wittmann
2005
1st  National Championship (Kilo)
1st  European Junior Track Championships (Kilo)
1st  European Junior Track Championships (Individual sprint)
1st  World Junior Track Cycling championships (Team sprint) with René Enders & Benjamin Wittmann
1st  World Junior Track Cycling championships (Kilo)
1st  World Junior Track Cycling championships (Individual sprint)
1st UCI Track World Cup – Manchester (Keirin)
2006
1st  European U23 Track Championships (Team sprint) René Enders & Michael Seidenbecher
1st  European U23 Track Championships (Individual sprint)
2008
1st  National Championship (Keirin)
2009
1st  World Track Cycling championships (Keirin)
1st Open NK wegsprint, (Enkhuizen)
1st  National Championship (Keirin)
2010
1st  World Track Cycling championships (Team sprint) with Robert Förstemann & Stefan Nimke
1st  European Track Championships (Team sprint) with Robert Förstemann & Stefan Nimke
2011
1st Manchester International Keirin
1st  National Championship (Keirin)
1st  National Championship (Team sprint) with Carsten Bergemann & Robert Förstemann
1st Astana (Team sprint) with Joachim Eilers & Robert Förstemann
1st UCI Track World Cup – Cali (Team sprint) with René Enders & Stefan Nimke
1st UCI Track World Cup – Cali (Keirin)
2012
1st UCI Track World Cup – London (Team sprint) with René Enders & Robert Förstemann
1st Cottbus (Keirin)
1st Köln (Individual sprint)
1st  National Championship (Team sprint) Stefan Bötticher & Max Niederlag
2013
1st  World Track Cycling championships (Team sprint) Stefan Bötticher & René Enders
1st Drei Bahnen Tournee (Individual sprint)
1st  National Championship (Kilo)
1st  National Championship (Keirin)
1st  European Track Championships (Team sprint) with René Enders & Robert Förstemann
1st  European Track Championships (Keirin)
2014
1st Wien, 1 km, Wien (Wien), Austria
1st Anadia (Individual sprint)
1st Anadia (Keirin)
2015
1st Cottbus (Individual sprint)
1st Dudenhofen (Individual sprint)
1st  National Championship (Individual sprint)
1st  National Championship (Keirin)
2016
1st Sprinters Omnium, Six Day Amsterdam
2nd Sprinters Omnium, Six Day London
2017
UEC European Track Championships
1st Keirin
2nd Team Sprint
1st Sprinters Omnium, Six Day Berlin
3rd Sprinters Omnium, Six Day London

References

External links

German male cyclists
Keirin cyclists
Cyclists at the 2008 Summer Olympics
Cyclists at the 2012 Summer Olympics
Cyclists at the 2016 Summer Olympics
Cyclists at the 2020 Summer Olympics
Olympic cyclists of Germany
Olympic silver medalists for Germany
Olympic bronze medalists for Germany
1987 births
Living people
Cyclists from Berlin
Olympic medalists in cycling
Medalists at the 2012 Summer Olympics
Medalists at the 2008 Summer Olympics
UCI Track Cycling World Champions (men)
German track cyclists
21st-century German people